Polycaon is a genus of horned powder-post beetles in the family Bostrichidae. There are at least four described species in Polycaon.

Description 
Beetles in this genus are 10.5-25.5 mm long with flattened bodies. The head is visible from above, instead of being hidden under a hoodlike pronotum like in some other bostrichids. The sides of the pronotum are convex. The tibia of each foreleg has a large, curved spine at its apex and has two terminal spurs inside.

Species
These four species belong to the genus Polycaon:
 Polycaon chilensis (Erichson, 1834) i c g
 Found in South America
 Polycaon granulatus (Van Dyke, 1923) i c g
 Found in North America
 Polycaon punctatus (LeConte, 1866) i c g
 Found in Central America
 Polycaon stoutii (LeConte, 1853) i c g b - black polycaon
 Found in western North America
Data sources: i = ITIS, c = Catalogue of Life, g = GBIF, b = Bugguide.net

References

Further reading

External links

 

Bostrichidae
Articles created by Qbugbot